Matthew Allan Longacre (born September 21, 1991) is a former American football outside linebacker. He played college football at Northwest Missouri State and signed with the St. Louis Rams as an undrafted free agent in 2015.

College career
Longacre attended and  played college football for Northwest Missouri State University, where he was named All-America defensive player of the year in 2013.  He was first-team All American in 2013 and 2014.  The Bearcats won the 2013 NCAA Division II national championship.  At the time he was ranked second all-time in school history sacks (30.5) and tackles-for-loss (47.0).

Professional career

Los Angeles Rams
After going undrafted in the 2015 NFL Draft, Longacre signed with the St. Louis Rams on May 8, 2015. He was waived by the Rams on September 5, 2015 and was signed to the practice squad the next day. On November 6, he was promoted to the active roster.

In the 2017 season, Longacre played in 14 games, recording 23 tackles and 5.5 sacks. He was placed on injured reserve on December 27, 2017 with a back injury.

On April 16, 2018, Longacre sign his restricted free agent tender. He played 13 games in the 2018 season, finishing with 17 tackles and a sack.

Arizona Cardinals
On July 24, 2019, Longacre signed with the Arizona Cardinals. After only four days on the team, he was released by the Cardinals.

References

External links
Los Angeles Rams bio
Northwest Missouri State Bearcats bio

1991 births
Living people
Players of American football from Nebraska
American football linebackers
American football defensive ends
Sportspeople from Omaha, Nebraska
Northwest Missouri State Bearcats football players
St. Louis Rams players
Los Angeles Rams players
Arizona Cardinals players